One Goal may refer to:

One Goal (film), a 2008 26-minute documentary film directed by the Spanish documentary maker Sergi Agustí
One Goal, anti-cancer fundraiser Pelotonia, U.S. bicycle ride to raise money for cancer research
"One Goal", song from Contact!